Survival Skills is a collaborative studio album by American rappers KRS-One and Buckshot. It was released on September 15, 2009 through Duck Down Music. Production was handled by Illmind, Black Milk, Khrysis, 9th Wonder, Coptic, DJ Mentplus, Havoc, Marco Polo, MoSS and Nottz. It features guest appearances from Bounty Killer, Heltah Skeltah, Immortal Technique, K'naan, Mary J. Blige, Melanie Fiona, Naledge, Pharoahe Monch, Slug, Smif-N-Wessun, Talib Kweli, the Loudmouf Choir and DJ Revolution.

The album peaked at number 62 on the Billboard 200, number 19 on the Top R&B/Hip-Hop Albums, number 11 on the Top Rap Albums and number 9 on the Independent Albums, with selling around 8,500 copies its first week in the United States.

The lead single, "Robot", was released on May 5, 2009, and accompaying music video, directed by Todd Angkasuwan, debuted as the New Joint of the Day on 106 & Park on September 4, 2009.

Critical reception 

Survival Skills was met with generally favorable reviews. At Metacritic, which assigns a normalized rating out of 100 to reviews from mainstream publications, the album received an average score of 67, based on eight reviews.

Steve Juon of RapReviews praised the album with a flawless 10 out of 10, claiming "Buckshot and KRS have achieved something rather remarkable here - an album I can't find a single fault with. There's not a bad beat, there's not a whack rhyme, there's not a collaborator on a track that missed the mark, and the disc itself is neither too short nor too long". AllMusic's David Jeffries stated that "loyal hip-hop heads with a taste for the old-school boom bap shouldn't think twice and won't be disappointed". Prefix Magazine reviewer called it "a call to arms, and a poetic, uncompromising one at that".

In a mixed review, Andrew Rennie of Toronto-based Now said, "KRS-One's wordplay remains clever and topical, especially on the anti-Auto-Tune anthem "Robot", while his sanctimoniousness has been toned down to more tolerable levels. Black Moon's Buckshot is a comfortable pairing and, although his street-savvy sound may not have aged as well as some of his Duck Down Records brethren's, he still finds a familiar dynamic when rapping alongside old cohorts". Writing for Spin, Mosi Reeves stated that "the beats by producers Black Milk, 9th Wonder and Havoc are strictly no-frills, but just hot enough to keep these cranky yet lovable old MCs' joints from stiffening up". Quentin B. Huff of PopMatters reviewed, "Ultimately, Survival Skills does what its creators intended for it to do: to be resolute in its dedication to lyrical acumen and head nodding production. Had they also been more adventurous with the content, the album would have risen to another level". Jesse Serwer of XXL said, "KRS and Buck might have first left Timberland-shaped footprints on hip-hop in the ’80s and early ’90s, respectively, but, on their first collaborative effort, they prove that not much has changed, and it truly is survival of the fittest".

In a negative review, Tom Breihan of Pitchfork wrote, "to catch a glimpse of these guys' past glories in 2009, your best option is still to go see them live; this is just a souvenir".

In his Consumer Guide, veteran music critic Robert Christgau gave the album a one-star honorable mention, saying it was "basically an old-school mixtape, wiser when it instructs the fathers than when it criticizes the sons"; he also picked its two songs "Think of All the Things" and "Runnin' Away".

Track listing

Charts

References

External links

2009 albums
KRS-One albums
Collaborative albums
Duck Down Music albums
Albums produced by MoSS
Albums produced by Nottz
Buckshot (rapper) albums
Albums produced by Illmind
Albums produced by Khrysis
Albums produced by 9th Wonder
Albums produced by Black Milk
Albums produced by Marco Polo
Albums produced by Havoc (musician)